Henrik Nilsson (born 1 March 1969) is a Swedish rower. He competed in the men's quadruple sculls event at the 1996 Summer Olympics.

References

External links
 

1969 births
Living people
Swedish male rowers
Olympic rowers of Sweden
Rowers at the 1996 Summer Olympics
Sportspeople from Skåne County